The men's 10 metre air pistol competition at the 2010 Asian Games in Guangzhou, China was held on 14 November at the Aoti Shooting Range.

Schedule
All times are China Standard Time (UTC+08:00)

Records

Results

Legend
DSQ — Disqualified

Qualification

Final

References

ISSF Results Overview

External links
Official website

Men Pistol 10